Zamość is a town in the Lublin Voivodeship in southeastern Poland.

Zamość may also refer to:
Zamość, Kuyavian-Pomeranian Voivodeship (north-central Poland)
Zamość, Łask County in Łódź Voivodeship (central Poland)
Zamość, Piotrków County in Łódź Voivodeship (central Poland)
Zamość, Maków County in Masovian Voivodeship (east-central Poland)
Zamość, Nowy Dwór Mazowiecki County in Masovian Voivodeship (east-central Poland)
Zamość, Ostrołęka County in Masovian Voivodeship (east-central Poland)
Zamość, Sierpc County in Masovian Voivodeship (east-central Poland)
Zamość, Wyszków County in Masovian Voivodeship (east-central Poland)
Zamość, Konin County in Greater Poland Voivodeship (west-central Poland)
Zamość, Ostrów Wielkopolski County in Greater Poland Voivodeship (west-central Poland)
Zamość, Września County in Greater Poland Voivodeship (west-central Poland)
Zamość, Pomeranian Voivodeship (north Poland)

People:
 David Zamość (1789–1864), German writer
 Israel Zamość (c. 1700–1772), Talmudist